The National Elk Refuge is a Wildlife Refuge located in Jackson Hole in the U.S. state of Wyoming. It was created in 1912 to protect habitat and provide sanctuary for one of the largest elk (also known as wapiti) herds. It is home to an average of 7,500 elk each winter. The refuge is managed by the U.S. Fish and Wildlife Service, an agency of the U.S. Department of the Interior.

The refuge's elk migrate from as far away as southern Yellowstone National Park. Historically, they migrated to the present location of the refuge and further south into southwestern Wyoming during the fall, wintering on grassy plains that were both sheltered from weather and that maintained less snowfall or snow depth than surrounding lands. During the spring, the herd would follow the retreating snows and growing grasses back into the Yellowstone National Park region. The original size of the elk herd has been estimated to have been in excess of 25,000. By the end of the 19th century, the town of Jackson had developed on important winter range, blocking off some of the migration routes used by the elk. The elk herd was severely reduced in size due to the hostile climate and lack of food supply, in addition to hunting pressures by both homesteaders and surrounding Native American tribes (Bannock). A movement to protect the remaining herd and establish greater numbers was commenced in the early 1900s. When the Miller homestead was sold for $45,000 to the federal government, the refuge was established.

The elk herd survives the hard winters of Jackson Hole through a supplementary feeding program and a lottery-based, permitted hunting program. The elk have antlers which are shed each year- the Boy Scouts of America have been collecting the antlers under permit since 1968 and selling them at auction, under agreement that 75% of the proceeds are returned to the refuge, where they are used for irrigation of the grasses to maintain maximum natural food supply. Ten to eleven thousand pounds (4,500 to 5,000 kg) of antlers are auctioned each year. The increase in value has resulted in a commensurate rise in antler theft, and the 2017 auction set a new record price of $18.79/lb.

The refuge also provides horse drawn sleigh rides to the public during the winter months so that visitors have the opportunity to see portions of the herd up close. 

The furthest consistent migration of elk to the refuge is currently from the southern portion of Yellowstone National Park, making it the second-longest ungulate migration in the lower 48 states. (The migration of pronghorn between the Green River basin and Jackson Hole is longer).

The largest single herd of bison under federal management, comprising 1,000 plus individuals, also winter on the refuge. Bighorn sheep, along with pronghorn, mule deer can be found. Rare sightings of wolf packs and grizzly bears have occurred, while coyotes and red foxes are more common. The most abundant birds include red-winged blackbirds, magpies, crows and ravens, along with trumpeter swans, which can be found along Flat Creek, which flows out of the refuge south into the town of Jackson. A total of 47 mammal species and 147 bird species have been documented on the refuge.

The refuge has a lower elevation and much milder climate than the rest of the Greater Yellowstone Ecosystem, which is why so many animals are drawn to winter on it. Most of it is snow-covered from November until March. Snowfalls are followed by sunny days, when some of the snow melts temporarily. South-facing slopes are free of snow for most of the winter.

References

Bibliography 
 Galloway, N. L., Monello, R. J., Brimeyer, D., Cole, E., & Hobbs, N. T. (2017). Model Forecasting of the Impacts of Chronic Wasting Disease on the Jackson Elk Herd.

External links
 National Elk Refuge, United States Fish and Wildlife Service
 National Elk Refuge: Refuge Road Wildlife Viewing Guide, U.S. Fish and Wildlife Service

National Wildlife Refuges in Wyoming
Protected areas of Teton County, Wyoming
Wetlands of Wyoming
Greater Yellowstone Ecosystem
Protected areas established in 1912
1912 establishments in Wyoming